Jharia Assembly constituency   is an assembly constituency in the Indian state of Jharkhand.

Members of Assembly 
 2005: Kunti Devi, Bharatiya Janata Party
 2009: Kunti Devi, Bharatiya Janata Party
 2014: Sanjeev Singh, Bharatiya Janata Party
 2019: Purnima Niraj Singh, Indian National Congress

Election Results

2019

See also
Vidhan Sabha
List of states of India by type of legislature

References

Assembly constituencies of Jharkhand
Politics of Dhanbad district